North Carolina's 10th House district is one of 120 districts in the North Carolina House of Representatives. It has been represented by Republican John Bell since 2013.

Geography
Since 2023, the district has included parts of Wayne County. The district overlaps with the 4th Senate district.

District officeholders since 1995

Election results

2022

2020

2018

2016

2014

2012

2010

2008

2006

2004

2002

2000

References

North Carolina House districts
Wayne County, North Carolina